In error detection and correction, majority logic decoding is a method to decode repetition codes, based on the assumption that the largest number of occurrences of a symbol was the transmitted symbol.

Theory
Generally , an odd number.

The repetition codes can detect up to  transmission errors. Decoding errors occur when more than these transmission errors occur.

Algorithm

 Calculate the  Hamming weight of the repetition code.
 if , decode code word to be all 0's
 if , decode code word to be all 1's

This algorithm is a boolean function in its own right, the majority function.

Example
In a  code, if R=[1 0 1 1 0], then 
it would be decoded as, 
  Hence the transmitted message bit was 1.

References
Rice University, https://web.archive.org/web/20051205194451/http://cnx.rice.edu/content/m0071/latest/

Error detection and correction